Crambus satrapellus is a moth in the family Crambidae. It was described by Zincken in 1821. It is found from the United States (Alabama, Florida, Georgia, Louisiana, Maryland, Michigan, Ohio, South Carolina and Texas) to Brazil.

Adults are on wing from July to September in most of North America, but year-round in Florida.

References

Crambini
Moths described in 1821
Moths of North America
Moths of South America